The base effect relates to inflation in the corresponding period of the previous year, if the inflation rate was too low in the corresponding period of the previous year, even a smaller rise in the Price Index will arithmetically give a high rate of inflation now. On the other hand, if the price index had risen at a high rate in the corresponding period of the previous year and recorded high inflation rate, a similar absolute increase in the price index now will show a lower inflation rate now.

An example of the base effect:
The Price Index is 100, 150, and 200 in each of three consecutive periods, called 1, 2, and 3, respectively.  The increase of 50 from period 1 to period 2 gives a percentage increase of 50%, but the increase from period 2 to period 3, despite being the same as the previous increase in absolute terms, gives a percentage increase of only 33.33%.  This is due to the relatively large difference in the bases on which the percentages are calculated (100 vs 150).

See also 
 Compound annual growth rate
 Path dependence
 Volatility tax

References

Inflation